(born 31 May 1980) is a Japanese professional racing cyclist. She rode at the 2015 UCI Track Cycling World Championships. She also competed at the 2014 Asian Games.

Major results
2015
Japan Track Cup
2nd Keirin
2nd Sprint
3rd Sprint
3rd Team Pursuit, Asian Track Championships (with Kisato Nakamura, Sakura Tsukagoshi and Minami Uwano)

References

1980 births
Living people
Japanese female cyclists
Place of birth missing (living people)
Cyclists at the 2014 Asian Games
Asian Games competitors for Japan
20th-century Japanese women
21st-century Japanese women